Juan Antonio Jimenez Cobo (born 11 May 1959) is a Spanish equestrian and Olympic medalist. He was born in Castro del Río. He won a silver medal in dressage at the 2004 Summer Olympics in Athens.

References

1959 births
Living people
Spanish male equestrians
Olympic equestrians of Spain
Olympic silver medalists for Spain
Equestrians at the 2000 Summer Olympics
Equestrians at the 2004 Summer Olympics
Olympic medalists in equestrian
Medalists at the 2004 Summer Olympics
21st-century Spanish people